Jean-Marie Trappeniers  (13 January 1942 – 2 November 2016) was a Belgian football goalkeeper.  He played for R.S.C. Anderlecht and Belgium. In 1964, during a match Belgium-Netherlands, Trappeniers replaced Delhasse on the pitch to join 10 fellows from Anderlecht playing under the national team kit.
Later in his career, he also played for Union Saint-Gilloise, Royal Antwerp F.C. and Eendracht Aalst.

Trappeniers died on 2 November 2016.

Honours

Player 
RSC Anderlecht

 Belgian First Division: 1961–62, 1963–64, 1964–65, 1965–66, 1966–67, 1967–68
 Belgian Cup: 1964–65
 Inter-Cities Fairs Cup runners-up: 1969–70

References

External links
 
 
 

1942 births
2016 deaths
Belgian footballers
Belgium international footballers
R.S.C. Anderlecht players
1970 FIFA World Cup players
Belgian Pro League players
Association football goalkeepers
People from Vilvoorde
Footballers from Flemish Brabant